The first supplementary elections took place for the National Assembly and the Legislative Yuan in the Republic of China on 20 December 1969. Voter turnout was 54.7% and 55.0% respectively.

Background
Between 1949 and 1969 both bodies were composed almost exclusively of delegates elected in 1947 and 1948, when the Government was on the Mainland. After moving to Taiwan the elected position of the representatives of provinces on the mainland in both the National Assembly and the Legislative Yuan was retained under the Temporary Provisions against the Communist Rebellion. However the number of delegates began to decline because of old age and attrition. In March 1966 the National Assembly approved regulations to make possible the replacement of retired members by elected members rather than leave the seats vacant or appoint members who had run in the 1948 election unsuccessfully. On 1 July 1969 the President announced a direct election was to be held for 15 new members to the National Assembly and 11 to the Legislative Yuan, all representing Taiwan Province and the special municipality of Taipei.

Results
All 15 newly elected members of the National Assembly belonged to the Kuomintang. Of the 11 newly elected members of the Legislative Yuan eight belonged to the Kuomintang and three were independent. All elected were born Taiwanese.

The newly elected delegates comprised only about one percent and three percent of the National Assembly and the Legislative Yuan respectively. Still, on the assumption the island was part of China, the election gave Taiwan a greater representation in these legislative organs than was constitutionally justified by its population.

Legislative Yuan

By constituency

National Assembly

References

Further reading
Copper, John F. and George P. Chen (1984), Taiwan’s Elections. Political Development and Democratization in the Republic of China, Occasional Papers/Reprints Series in Contemporary Asian Studies, no. 5-1984 (64), 

Taiwan
Legislative
Legislative elections in Taiwan
Election and referendum articles with incomplete results